Geoff James Nugent (born 14 February 1977), known professionally as Jim Jefferies, is an Australian comedian, actor, and writer who holds dual Australian and American citizenship. He created and starred in the American FX sitcom Legit (2013–2014) and the Comedy Central late-night show The Jim Jefferies Show (2017–2019).

Early life 
Jefferies was born Geoff James Nugent in Sydney on 14 February 1977, the son of a mother who worked as a substitute teacher and a father who was a cabinet maker and maintenance worker. His father was from Roma, Queensland. Jefferies grew up in Sydney before moving to Perth to study musical theatre and classical music at the Western Australian Academy of Performing Arts. though he left several months before graduating. He has two older brothers: Scott, an investment banker, and Daniel, an inspector in the New South Wales Police Force's Public Order and Riot Squad.

Career

Stand-up 
Jefferies began his stand-up comedy career after dropping out of university, initially returning to his native Sydney before relocating to the United Kingdom. He took the stage name "Jim Jeffries", but amended the last name to "Jefferies" to avoid confusion with a similarly named American performer. He initially began performing stand-up with one-liners. He changed to anecdotal humour when he began doing hour-long sets. He first achieved international attention in 2007, when he was attacked onstage while performing at the Manchester Comedy Festival. Footage of the incident was incorporated into his act and can be seen on his 2008 DVD Contraband. He became known in the United States in 2009, after the release of his debut HBO special I Swear to God.

Jefferies has performed at the Edinburgh Festival Fringe, Just for Laughs, Melbourne International Comedy Festival, Reading and Leeds Festivals, and Glastonbury Festival. He has also performed routines on The World Stands Up, Comedy Blue and Edinburgh and Beyond for Comedy Central. Following the release of his Netflix special Freedumb in July 2016, he began The Unusual Punishment Tour with all-new material, and filmed his new special This Is Me Now at the Hammersmith Apollo in London in January 2018. On 17 December 2018, he completed his Night Talker Tour with the final performance in Melbourne.

Legit 
Jefferies' comedy series Legit premiered on 17 January 2013 on FX. A second season premiered on 26 February 2014, having been moved to FXX. The series received positive attention among the disabled community for its portrayal of people with mental and physical disabilities. The series was cancelled after two seasons.

The Jim Jefferies Show 
On 3 March 2017, Comedy Central announced The Jim Jefferies Show, a new ten-episode weekly series, that premiered on 6 June 2017. Jefferies, hosting the show, takes a look on culture and politics behind his desk, and travels around the world to tackle the week's top stories and most controversial issues. On 25 July 2017, the first season was extended with ten additional episodes, that completed airing on 21 November 2017. On 15 January 2018, Comedy Central renewed the series for a twenty-episode second season, which premiered on 27 March 2018. The network renewed the show for a third season in January 2019, which premiered on 19 March 2019. The series concluded on 19 November 2019, after the end of its third season.

Other work 
From November 2010 to November 2012, Jefferies co-hosted the podcast Jim and Eddie Talkin' Shit with his fellow comedian and former roommate, Eddie Ifft. Jefferies had to quit because of his busy work schedule.

Jefferies appeared on comedy panel shows such as Never Mind the Buzzcocks, Have I Got News for You, The Heaven and Earth Show and 8 Out of 10 Cats, the US comedy panel show The Green Room with Paul Provenza and Comedy Central's @midnight. He has also been featured on various radio programmes, including BBC Radio 5 Live's Saturday morning sports show, Opie and Anthony, and Fighting Talk.

In 2015, he starred in Australian film Me and My Mates vs the Zombie Apocalypse with comedians Greg Fleet and Alex Williamson. It premiered on 25 July and was released on DVD and Vimeo in Australia and New Zealand in late 2015, and in the UK, Ireland, and the US in 2016.

In 2019, Jefferies and Suzanne Martin developed the sitcom Jefferies for NBC, in which Jefferies will star as a fictionalized version of himself.

Jeffries has hosted the I Don't Know About That podcast alongside Kelly Blackheart, Forrest Shaw, and Jack Hackett since May 2020.

Personal life 
Jefferies lives in Studio City, California. He was previously in a relationship with actress Kate Luyben. Their son was born in 2012. He married English actress Tasie Lawrence in September 2020. Their son was born in 2021.

Jefferies is an atheist. He was diagnosed as autistic at the age of 36. In 2018, he became a naturalized American citizen.

Filmography

Film

Television

Discography 
 2008: Hell Bound (CD)
 2008: Contraband (DVD)
 2009: I Swear to God (video download)
 2010: Alcoholocaust (DVD)
 2012: Fully Functional (video download/DVD)
 2014: Bare (video download)
 2016: Freedumb (video download)
 2018: This Is Me Now (Netflix)
 2020: Intolerant (Netflix)
 2023: High & Dry (Netflix)

References

External links 
 Official website
 

1977 births
Living people
21st-century atheists
21st-century Australian male actors
21st-century Australian writers
21st-century Australian comedians
21st-century Australian male writers
Australian activists
Australian atheism activists
Australian columnists
Australian comedy writers
Australian expatriates in England
Australian humorists
Australian male comedians
Australian male film actors
Australian male television actors
Australian podcasters
Australian political commentators
Australian political writers
Australian satirists
Australian social commentators
Australian stand-up comedians
Australian television producers
Australian emigrants to the United States
Comedians from Sydney
Critics of creationism
Critics of religions
Free speech activists
Gun control advocates
Late night television talk show hosts
Male actors from Sydney
Naturalized citizens of the United States
Political activists
Writers from Sydney